Rajanna Sircilla district is a district in the Indian state of Telangana. Sircilla is the district headquarters. The district shares boundaries with Karimnagar, Siddipet, Jagtial, Kamareddy, and Nizamabad districts.

Geography 
This district is bounded by Jagtial District in the North, Karimnagar District in the North East, Siddipet District in the South, Kamareddy District in the West and Nizamabad District in the North West.

Demographics 
 Census of India, the district has a population of 546,121.
This district has a literacy rate 62.71%.

Administrative divisions 
The district will have two revenue division of Sircilla and Vemulawada It is sub-divided into 13 mandals. Anuraag Jayanti IAS
is the present collector of the district.

See also 
 List of districts in Telangana

References

External links 

 Rajanna Sircilla district

Districts of Telangana